Amphisbaena xera, known commonly as the dry worm lizard, Puerto Rican dryland worm lizard, or the North American worm lizard, is a worm lizard species. It is endemic to Puerto Rico.

Etymology
The specific name, xera, which is from Greek via Late Latin, means "dry".

Geographic range
It is found in Puerto Rico, both on the main island and also on the offshore Isla de Caja de Muertos.

See also

Fauna of Puerto Rico
List of endemic fauna of Puerto Rico

References

Further reading
Schwartz, A., and R. Thomas. 1975. A Check-list of West Indian Amphibians and Reptiles. Carnegie Museum of Natural History Special Publication No. 1. Pittsburgh, Pennsylvania: Carnegie Museum of Natural History. 216 pp. (Amphisbaena xera, p. 69.)
Thomas, R. 1966. Additional Notes on the Amphisbaenids of Greater Puerto Rico. Breviora (249): 1-23. ("Amphisbaena xera'' new species", pp. 7–13, Figure 3.)

xera
Reptiles of Puerto Rico
Endemic fauna of Puerto Rico
Reptiles described in 1966
Taxa named by Richard Thomas (herpetologist)